Irving Equipment, a division of J.D. Irving, Limited, can trace its roots back to 1958. The division was created to support various construction industries in the Saint John, New Brunswick, Canada area including shipbuilding, oil refining (Irving Oil), and pulp and paper mill expansions.

Irving Equipment is a member of the Crane Rental Association of Canada  and was one of the many companies involved with its formation and the 2008-2009 Chairman was Roger Cyr of Irving Equipment.  Kyle Jardine of Irving Equipment currently sits on the 2010-2011 CRAC Board of Directors.

Business activities 
Irving Equipment provides crane rentals, heavy lift and heavy haul services in Atlantic Canada and has expanded into the United States, with operations in New England and the Ohio River Valley region with a fleet of over 140 cranes ranging from 8-Ton to 825-ton capacity. Utilizing multi-axle transport modules, Irving Equipment can transport loads up to 1000 tons.

With the expansion of the Saint John Irving Oil refinery, in the mid-70's they expanded into pile driving and in 1984 Irving Equipment separated out its civil contracting operations to form Gulf Operators. Gulf Operators is currently a civil contractor that also produces aggregate.

Awards and recognition

In 1994, two Professional Engineers, Fred Dickinson and Jeff Dacey, received the individual Award for Technical Excellence from the New Brunswick Society of Professional Engineers for their work on CraneCad.

In 2008, Irving Equipment received a 30-year Longevity Award from the Specialty Carriers and Rigging Association.

Irving Equipment is listed on the American Cranes and Transport ACT 50, which has now expanded to the ACT100, its annual assessment of the continent's top crane-owning companies. In 2009, Irving Equipment ranked 31st in its ACT100 list.  And in 2010, increased to number 27.

In 2008, International Crane and Specialized Transport Magazine ranked them 45th on the IC50, a list of the top crane owning companies in the world.  In 2009, Irving Equipment moved up to 44th in the list, and held that position for the 2010 IC50 listing.

Irving Crane 

In 1999 Irving Equipment expanded into the United States when they opened a crane rental office in Eliot, Maine under the name Irving Equipment Inc. Additional offices were  later added in Hampton, New Hampshire and Burlington, Massachusetts. In 2008 a branch was added in Charleston, West Virginia.

In 2009 the company began operating in the United States as Irving Crane.

CraneCAD 

In 1987 Irving Equipment developed its own lift planning software called CraneCAD. This software was built on top of the AutoCAD platform by two Professional Engineers, Fred Dickinson and Jeff Dacey, and the project received partial funding from the National Research Council of Canada. Using CraneCAD, engineers are able to create three-dimensional models of their project site to accurately determine the type of crane and the precise lift configuration required for each lift.

References

External links
 Irving Equipment
 Gulf Operators
 J.D. Irving Limited

Point LePreau Generating Station refurbishment 
 Telegraph Journal 07/01/2009
 Telegraph Journal 07/03/2009

Conglomerate companies of Canada
Transport companies of Canada
Companies based in Saint John, New Brunswick
Business services companies established in 1958
1958 establishments in New Brunswick